Predrag 'Peca' Kodžo (born on January 30, 1973) is a  Serbian footballer. In Serbia, he is well known as "Peca". Well known for his technical skills and attractive playing style.

Career in Inđija
Being born in Inđija, the majority of Predrag Kodžo's football career has taken place in the town's biggest club, FK Inđija. While the club was still playing in the Serbian First League, Kodžo played in 49 competitive matches and scored 3 times. One of the greatest highlights of his career was when he scored a goal against FK Metalac Gornji Milanovac on November 13, 2010, at an age of 37 years.  For FK Inđija, Kodžo played in 532 matches and scored 144 goals. After retiring, he became director in FK Inđija.  He reactivated his career and joined PSK Putinci.

References

External links
 Predrag Kodžo Stats at Utakmica.rs
 Predrag Kodžo story at Fkindjija.rs

Living people
1973 births
People from Inđija
FK Inđija players
FK ČSK Čelarevo players
Association football midfielders
Serbia and Montenegro footballers
Serbian footballers